The S2 8.5, also called the S2 8.5A, is an American sailboat that was designed by Arthur Edmunds as a cruiser and first built in 1980. The designation indicates the approximate length overall in meters.

Production
The design was built by S2 Yachts in Holland, Michigan, United States, starting in 1980, with 103 boats completed, but it is now out of production.

Design
The S2 8.5 is a recreational keelboat, built predominantly of fiberglass, with wood trim. It has a masthead sloop rig, a raked stem, a reverse transom, an internally mounted spade-type rudder controlled by a wheel, with an emergency back-up tiller and a fixed fin keel or optional shoal draft keel. It displaces  and carries  of lead ballast.

A few early production boats had BMW diesel inboards.

The design has sleeping accommodation for four people, with a double "V"-berth in the bow cabin along with a folding table that seats four, plus two straight settee berths in the main cabin. The galley is located to the port side at the companionway and is equipped with a two-burner stove, an icebox and a sink. The fully-enclosed head is located just aft of the bow cabin and includes a shower.

Operational history
In a 2000 review in Practical Sailor, Darrell Nicholson wrote, "the S2 8.5 is a good boat for cruising the Great Lakes or any coast in comfort and a certain amount of style. Her appearance may be a little modern for traditionalists, with her straight sheer and European-style cabin windows. Pricey? Yes, but when you look at the things that go into the boat—the rig, good sails, and a comfortable, well finished interior—the price may seem a bit less painful. You still pay for what you get."

See also
List of sailing boat types

References

External links
Photo of an S2 8.5

Keelboats
1980s sailboat type designs
Sailing yachts
Trailer sailers
Sailboat type designs by Arthur Edmunds
Sailboat types built by S2 Yachts